Hunt House or Hunt Farm may refer to:

in Canada
Hunt House, Calgary, in Alberta

in the United States
(by state)
 Hunt Bass Hatchery Caretaker's House, Phoenix, Arizona, listed on the NRHP in Phoenix, Arizona
 Thomas Hunt House, Plainview, Arkansas, listed on the NRHP in White County, Arkansas
 Hunt House (Searcy, Arkansas), listed on the NRHP in Yolo County, Arkansas
 Dresbach-Hunt-Boyer House, Davis, California, listed on the NRHP in Yolo County, California
 Hunt House (Griffin, Georgia), listed on the NRHP in Spalding County, Georgia
 Cabiness-Hunt House, Round Oak, Georgia, listed on the NRHP in Jones County, Georgia
 Daniel A. Hunt House, Dietrich, Idaho, listed on the NRHP in Lincoln County, Idaho
 E. F. Hunt House, Meridian, Idaho, listed on the NRHP in Ada County, Idaho
 Hunt House (St. Charles, Illinois), NRHP-listed
 Daniel Hunt Three-Decker, Worcester, Massachusetts, NRHP-listed
 David Hunt Three-Decker, Worcester, Massachusetts, NRHP-listed
 William B. Hunt House, Columbia, Missouri, NRHP-listed
 Wilson Price Hunt House, Normandy, Missouri, listed on the NRHP in St. Louis County, Missouri
 Parley Hunt House, Bunkerville, Nevada, listed on the NRHP in Nevada
 Hunt Farmstead, Rosedale, New Jersey, listed on the NRHP in Mercer County, New Jersey
 Hunt House (Hopewell Township, New Jersey), listed on the NRHP in Mercer County, New Jersey
 George Hunt House, Pohatcong Township, New Jersey, listed on the NRHP in Warren County, New Jersey
 Hunt House (Waterloo, New York), NRHP-listed
 Joseph P. Hunt Farm, Dexter, North Carolina, listed on the NRHP in Granville County, North Carolina
 Hunt-Wilke Farm, Cuyahoga Falls, Ohio, listed on the NRHP in Summit County, Ohio
 Hunt-Forman Farm, Franklin, Ohio, listed on the NRHP in Warren County, Ohio
 Henson Hunt House, Johnson City, Tennessee, listed on the NRHP in Carter County, Tennessee
 Hunt-Moore House, Huntland, Tennessee, listed on the NRHP in Franklin County, Tennessee
 Hunt-Phelan House, Memphis, Tennessee, listed on the NRHP in Shelby County, Tennessee
 Jones-Hunt House, Houston, Texas, listed on the NRHP in Harris County, Texas
 Hunt-Sitterding House, Richmond, Virginia, listed on the NRHP in Richmond, Virginia
 W. Ben Hunt Cabin, Hales Corners, Wisconsin, listed on the NRHP in Milwaukee County, Wisconsin
 Samuel Hunt House, Rutland, Wisconsin, listed on the NRHP in Dane County, Wisconsin